Daniel Cronin may refer to:

 Dan Cronin (born 1959), Illinois politician
 Daniel Cronin (bishop) (born 1927), American bishop
 Dan Cronin (baseball) (1857–1885), baseball player

See also 
 Cronin
 Marcus Daniel Cronin (1865–1936), United States military officer